Uguzevo (Ügeź) is a rural locality (a village) in Starotukmaklinsky Selsoviet, Kushnarenkovsky District, Bashkortostan, Russia. The population was 304 as of 2010. There are 5 streets.

Geography 
Uguzevo is located 25 km south of Kushnarenkovo (the district's administrative centre) by road. Kazarma is the nearest rural locality.

References 

Rural localities in Kushnarenkovsky District